Meelad Air was a private aviation company and charter airline based in Amman, Jordan, specializing in short and long-term aircraft charter and lease, especially during Hajj and Umra season. It became operational in 2006 and was shut down again in 2008.

Fleet
The Meelad Air fleet included the following aircraft (as of March 2009):

2 McDonnell Douglas MD-83 (which were operated by Royal Falcon)

As of August 2010, Meelad's MD-83s operate under Sky Express' AOC.

References

External links 
Official website

2008 disestablishments in Jordan
Defunct airlines of Jordan
Airlines established in 2005
Airlines disestablished in 2008
Jordanian companies established in 2005